Ochetellus flavipes, the spinifex ant, is a species of ant in the genus Ochetellus. Described by William Forsell Kirby in 1896, the species is endemic to Australia.

References

Dolichoderinae
Hymenoptera of Australia
Insects described in 1896